Niilo Orama (8 December 1926 – 26 December 1986) was a Finnish sailor. He competed in the Dragon event at the 1948 Summer Olympics.

References

External links
 

1926 births
1986 deaths
Finnish male sailors (sport)
Olympic sailors of Finland
Sailors at the 1948 Summer Olympics – Dragon
Sportspeople from Helsinki